Ina Räderer is a former German curler.

At the national level, she is a 1990 German women's champion curler.

Teams

References

External links
 

Living people
German female curlers
German curling champions
Date of birth missing (living people)
Place of birth missing (living people)
Year of birth missing (living people)